Presidential elections were held in Lithuania in December 2002 and January 2003. In the first round on 22 December 2002, Valdas Adamkus held a large lead over Rolandas Paksas of the Liberal Democratic Party (LDP). However, Paksas defeated Adamkus in the second round held on 5 January 2003.

Seventeen candidates contested in these elections, making it the largest field of presidential candidates in presidential elections up to date.

Results
Adamkus was supported by the Lithuanian Union of Political Prisoners and Deportees.

References

External links
2002–03 Lithuanian presidential elections VRK 

Lithuania
Presidential election
Lithuania
Presidential election
Presidential elections in Lithuania